Auburn is a historic home located at Bowling Green, Caroline County, Virginia. It was built about 1843, and is a two-story, three bay wide, frame dwelling in the Greek Revival style. It sits on a brick English basement. It has a two-story rear ell added in the late-19th century and a sunroom added about 1930.  Also on the property is a contributing shed (c. 1940).

It was listed on the National Register of Historic Places in 2006.

References

Houses on the National Register of Historic Places in Virginia
Greek Revival houses in Virginia
Houses completed in 1843
Houses in Caroline County, Virginia
National Register of Historic Places in Caroline County, Virginia
1843 establishments in Virginia